WYCI (channel 40) is a television station licensed to Saranac Lake, New York, United States, serving the Burlington, Vermont–Plattsburgh, New York area as an affiliate of MyNetworkTV. It is owned by Gray Television alongside Burlington-licensed CBS affiliate WCAX-TV (channel 3). Both stations share studios on Joy Drive in South Burlington, Vermont, while WYCI's transmitter is located on Mount Pisgah north of Saranac Lake, along the Essex–Franklin county line.

Although WYCI is licensed as a full-power station, its broadcast range only covers the immediate Saranac Lake/Lake Placid area. Therefore, the station currently relies on cable and satellite carriage to reach the entire Burlington–Plattsburgh market. However, it has a construction permit to move its transmitter eastward to Terry Mountain in Peru, New York, where it will fully cover the Champlain Valley area. 

WYCU-LD (virtual channel 40, RF channel 26), licensed to both Charlestown, New Hampshire, and Rockingham, Vermont, operates as a translator of WYCI serving southern Vermont and western New Hampshire; this station's transmitter is located in Claremont, New Hampshire.

History 
The station applied for its construction permit on September 22, 1995. The Federal Communications Commission (FCC) approved it on October 4, 2004. It originally planned to use UHF analog channel 61 (from which the Channel 61 Associates, LLC name for the station's licensee was derived) but switched to channel 40 because channels 51-69 would not to be used for television after the DTV transition. In 2006, the station decided on the call letters WCWF, sparking speculation that the station would be an affiliate of The CW. However, that affiliation went to Fox affiliate WFFF-TV (channel 44), first as a replacement for its secondary WB affiliation and then on a new digital subchannel. (The CW affiliation later moved to a subchannel of NBC affiliate WPTZ, channel 5; it now airs on sister station WNNE, channel 31).

While it searched for its own affiliation, WCWF finally began broadcasting on September 11, 2007, as a repeater of Ion Television affiliate WWBI-LP, whose owners held a stake in the station. After a short time on-the-air, the station signed off, telling the FCC it was preparing to switch to digital. In November 2008, Channel 61 Associates sold the station to Twin Valley Television, a broadcaster based in Burlington which also goes by Convergence Entertainment & Communications, or CEC. Twin Valley took control of the station while the sale was still pending FCC approval. As of 2011, however, the application for transfer of ownership no longer appears on the FCC website. 

At the end of 2008, it signed back on from a temporary low power analog transmitter, which was meant to last until its permanent digital transmitter was ready on June 12, 2009. However, there were delays in getting its new transmitter installed so the station switched its temporary transmitter to digital for the time being. In early 2009, the station became an affiliate of the Retro Television Network. On June 16, 2009, WCWF changed its call letters to WNMN.

Meanwhile, Twin Valley also purchased WGMU-CA (formerly Vermont's MyNetworkTV affiliate once owned by Equity Media Holdings) which was approved by the FCC in July 2009. That station and its translators were turned into repeaters of WNMN, which greatly expanded its coverage area into the greater Burlington and Plattsburgh areas. The owner announced that WNMN would air a mix of RTV and local programming on its main channel, while also carrying five digital subchannels, one of which would air MyNetworkTV (WGMU's former affiliation). MyNetworkTV affiliate WNMN-DT3 also began offering Tuff TV on July 15, 2010. The subchannel was to be carried on Comcast channel 18, but was never made available.

Cross Hill Communications, LLC was granted the license of WNMN by the FCC on October 30, 2013. At that time they became a TUFF TV affiliate. On March 9, 2016, the call sign was changed to WYCI. As of 2017, most likely as a direct result of this transition of station management, WYCI offered no subchannels other than its primary Retro TV channel, leaving the Burlington–Plattsburgh market without a MyNetworkTV affiliate. As of April 1, 2017, WYCI became a Heroes and Icons affiliate; sometime in 2018, they eventually resumed operations of their DT2 subchannel, this time offering the Decades service. WYCI is carried on Comcast and Spectrum (former Time Warner and Charter) systems throughout the market. By January 1, 2018, both Dish Network and DirecTV started carrying WYCI throughout the market. On September 3, 2018, MyNetworkTV programming returned to the Burlington–Plattsburgh market (ironically over the very station that had formerly offered it on their DT3 subchannel), this time on their primary channel as a secondary affiliation to Heroes & Icons (H&I), and filling in programming for all time slots outside of the MyNetworkTV programming schedule with the H&I schedule.

On October 31, 2019, Gray Television announced plans to acquire WYCI from Cross Hill Communications. The sale was completed on January 31, 2020, forming a duopoly with WCAX-TV.

Technical information

Subchannels
The station's digital signal is multiplexed:

Translators

WNMN was previously relayed on a network of four translators:

WGMU-LP, W19BR and WBVT-LP had their licenses cancelled by the FCC on March 12, 2015, for failure to broadcast for a year. WVMA-CD has since been sold to another ownership group.

References 

Television channels and stations established in 2007
2007 establishments in New York (state)
YCI
Heroes & Icons affiliates
Decades (TV network) affiliates
Gray Television